The Vesta Veterans Head which often sees notable entries under the title the Vesta Veterans International Head of the River Race is a rowing race held annually on the River Thames over the Championship Course.

Course
The direction in which it is raced will be advertised as the preferred ebb tide, if that occurs fairly near the middle of the day. The direction is confirmed from many weeks ahead on the race website. It is raced from Mortlake to Putney or vice versa.

Categories and entries
It is open to veteran (also known as masters) eights and quads, who race in prize categories determined by their average ages, plus novice prizes for the least-race-points crews in the men's, women's and mixed categories, which are further sub-categories of each category. The race always takes place on the day after the Head of the River Race. There is on-water marshalling provided and an entry fee applies. Any surplus money is applied to further the sport of rowing.

Organiser
It is organised by Vesta Rowing Club.

External links
Veterans Head

Mortlake, London
Rowing in the United Kingdom
Water sports in London
Head races